Yuina Yamamoto (born 1 February 2003) is a Japanese professional footballer who plays as a forward for WE League club Albirex Niigata Ladies.

Club career 
Yamamoto made her WE League debut on 20 November 2021.

References 

Living people
2003 births
Women's association football forwards
WE League players
Japanese women's footballers
Albirex Niigata Ladies players
Association football people from Hyōgo Prefecture